Musaeum Hermeticum ("Hermetic library") is a compendium of alchemical texts first published in German, in Frankfurt, 1625 by Lucas Jennis. Additional material was added for the 1678 Latin edition, which in turn was reprinted in 1749.

Its purpose was apparently to supply in a compact form a representative collection of relatively brief and less ancient alchemical writings; it could be regarded as a supplement to those large storehouses of Hermetic learning such as the Theatrum Chemicum, or Jean-Jacques Manget's Bibliotheca Chemica Curiosa. It seemed to represent a distinctive school in Alchemy, less committed to the past and less obscure than the works of older and more traditional alchemical masters.

The full Latin title is: ".
Jennis"

The first edition contained:
 The Remonstrances of Nature ascribed to Jean de Meung
 The Twelve Keys of Basil Valentine
 Subtle Allegory (Michael Maier)
 Three Treatise of Philalethes
 The Book of Alze
 Open Entrance to the Closed Palace - Philalethes
 A Tract of Great Price
 The Only True Way
 The Testament of Cremer
 The Glory of the World
 The Waterstone of the Wise
 The Golden Tract concerning the Philosopher's Stone

The illustrated book contains 445 + 35 pages.

The 1678 edition is 863 pages long, and includes:

References

External links

Musaeum hermeticum etc. (1625 German edition)l
Musaeum hermeticum etc. (1678 Latin edition)
Musaeum hermeticum etc. (1678 Latin edition)
Musaeum Hermeticum etc. (English translation at "The Alchemy Website")
The Hermetic Museum, restored and enlarged (English A. E. Waite edition, 1898)
The Hermetic Museum, restored and enlarged Vol I (of II) (A scanned UMI copy of volume one from the Cecil H. Green Library at Stanford, published in 1893 introduction written by A.E. Waite, the translator of the original texts is anonymous)

1625 books
Emblem books
Occult books
Alchemical documents